Vladimirsky (masculine), Vladimirskaya (feminine), Vladimirskoye (neuter) or variant spellings may refer to:

Buildings
Vladimir Palace (Vladimirsky dvorets), an imperial palace in Saint Petersburg, Russia
Vladimirskaya (Saint Petersburg Metro), a station of the Saint Petersburg Metro
Vladimirskaya Church, a Russian Orthodox Church on Vladimirski Prospekt, Saint Petersburg, Russia

Places
Vladimirsky District, name of several districts in Russia
Vladimirsky Municipal Okrug, a municipal okrug of Tsentralny District of St. Petersburg, Russia
Vladimirsky (rural locality) (Vladimirskaya, Vladimirskoye), name of several rural localities in Russia
Vladimirsky Lager, a rural locality in Pskov Oblast, Russia
Vladimir Oblast, a federal subject of Russia
Vladimirskaya Square, a square in Saint Petersburg
Vladimirski Prospekt, the street in St Petersburg, Russia, on which the Lensovet Theatre is located

People
Boris Mikhajlovich Vladimirskij, astronomer, after whom the planet 3591 Vladimirskij was named
Boris Vladimirski (1878–1950), Soviet painter
Mikhail Vladimirsky (1874–1951), Soviet politician
Tomo Vladimirski (1896–?), Macedonian painter

Other uses
Vladimirskaya, more commonly known as Theotokos of Vladimir, a famous Russian icon in Moscow
3591 Vladimirskij, a minor planet

See also
Vladimir (disambiguation)
Vladimirov, a Russian and Bulgarian surname
Vladimirovka (disambiguation)
Vladimirskiy rozhok, a musical instrument